This is a partial list of Indian rock-cut temples by state or union territory.

Andhra Pradesh

 Akkanna Madanna Caves, Vijayawada
 Belum Caves, Kurnool district
 Bhairavakona Caves, Hindu temple caves located at Ambavaram Kothapalli, CS Pur Mandal, Prakasam district
 Bodhikonda and Ghanikonda Caves, Ramatheertham, Vizianagaram district
 Bojjannakonda and Lingalakonda, Anakapalle, Visakhapatnam district
 Borra Caves, Aruku Valley, Visakhapatnam district
 Guntupalle Caves (near Dwaraka Tirumala), West Godavari district, popularly known as "Andhra Ajanta", believed to pre-date even the Ajanta and Ellora caves of Maharashtra
 Moghalrajpuram caves
 Undavalli caves, Guntur district
 Srimukhalingam, Srikakulam district

Assam

 Longthaini Noh, Maibong, Dima Hasao
 Dudhnath, jogighopa, South Salmara

Bihar 
 Son Bhandar Caves
 Barabar Caves
 Lomas Rishi Caves

Goa
 Harvalem Caves, Sanquelim, Goa 403505, circa. 6th century.

Gujarat
 Dhank Caves
 Junagadh Buddhist Cave Groups, Junagadh district
 Bava Pyara Caves
 Kadia Dungar Caves
 Khambhalida Caves
 Sana Caves
 Siyot Caves, Lakhpat Taluka, Kutch district
 Talaja Caves, Bhavnagar district

Haryana
None of these have been studied scientifically yet.
 Dhosi Hill cave temple in Aravalli Mountain Range, Narnaul, Mahendragarh district
 Nar Narayan Cave Temple in Sivalik Hills range, Yamuna Nagar district
 Tosham Hill cave temple in Aravalli Mountain Range, Hisar-Tosham road, Bhiwani district

Himachal Pradesh

Masroor Rock Cut Temple
15 rock-cut temples in the Indo-Aryan style are richly carved. This is a unique monolithic structure in the sub-Himalayan region.
The main shrine contains three stone images of Rama, Lakshmana and Sita. The temple complex is located on a hill and has a large rectangular water pond. The temple complex is believed to have been built by the Pandava during their exile; the exact date is not known. The ancient name of the city Kangra was Bhimnagar, founded by Bhima, one of the Pandava brothers.

Karnataka

 Aihole
 Badami cave temples
 Gavi Gangadhareshwara Temple
 Hulimavu Shiva cave temple
 Narasimha Jharni
 Nellitheertha Cave Temple
Elora kailash temple

JAMMU and Kashmir
 Amarnath Temple (pahalgam) (kashmir)
 Vaishno Devi Temple (katra) (Jammu)

Kerala

Madhya Pradesh
 Bagh Caves
 Bhimbetka rock shelters
 Lohani Caves
 Udaygiri Caves

Maharashtra

Odisha

Tamil Nadu

Uttarakhand
 Patal Bhuvaneshwar

See also

 Cave research in India
 Indian rock-cut architecture
 List of caves
 List of caves in India
 List of colossal sculpture in situ
 List of India cave temples
 Speleology

References

Further reading

External links

 National Geographic Magazine (2008). Faces of the Divine: India's Ancient Art – Interactive Map.

 
Temples
 
Cave temples